Korfos is a small port town located on the coast of Sofiko Bay, in the southeastern part of Corinthia, Greece.

References

Populated places in Corinthia